Get My Son Dead or Alive is a 1982 Filipino action thriller drama film directed by Pepe Marcos. The film stars Eddie Garcia, Rudy Fernandez and Vic Vargas.

Plot
This is the story of Lt. Renato Parraguas (Fernandez), a former soldier assigned in a mission against the NPA rebel guerrillas. His father Maj. Ricardo Parraguas (Garcia), a military officer hunts the NPAs that have captured his son. Unbeknownst to Maj. Garcia, Renato has already joined the NPA under the nom de guerre Ka Dante.

Cast
Eddie Garcia as Maj. Ricardo Parraguas
Rudy Fernandez as Lt. Renato Parraguas/Ka Rene
Vic Vargas as Capt. Carlo Mendoza
Marilou Bendigo as Ka Milagros
Perla Bautista as Martha Parraguas 
Philip Gamboa as David
Nick Aladdin
Jing Caparas
Renato del Prado as Ka Rodrigo
Joseph de Cordova
Danny Riel
Ernie Forte
Baldo Marro as Ka Lawin
Jose Romulo Ka Rosas
Larry Silva as Tribio 
Joaquin Fajardo
Liberty De Ramos
Vilma Vitug

References

External links

1982 films
1982 action thriller films
1980s crime action films
Filipino-language films
Philippine action thriller films
Tagalog-language films
Films directed by Pepe Marcos